Aralumallige Parthsarathy (born 22 March, 1948 in Bangalore, India) is an international scholar and expert in the field of Dasa Sahitya, which preaches the values and culture of the historic Bhakthi movement, practised through the centuries in the Haridasa Sahitya and taking its lineage from Madhwacharya. He is the author of 52 books and 35 audio CDs, has undertaken international lecture tours, and is the recipient of many national and international awards.

Life and work
Aralumallige Parthasarathy was born in Aralumallige village in Bangalore district on March 22, 1948, and lives in Bangalore. He is a retired lecturer from MES College in Bangalore.

Aralumallige Parthasarathy has authored several books on Dasa sahitya, Vishnu sahasranama, spirituality, culture, literature and management. His works include many audio CDs on the scriptures of Dasa Sahitya, Bhagavatha, Bhagavad Gita and Ramayana. He produces writings and gives lectures on Dasa Sahitya, Bhagavatha, Vishnu Sahasranama, Indian heritage, Indian culture, and Indian values. He has delivered more than 4,000 lectures. His Vishnu Sahasranama movement, for which he is the founder has become very popular in different countries. He has delivered 308 Bhagavatha Saptaha programs in English and Kannada language in different countries.

Dr. Aralumallige is the chairman of Vishnusahasranama Trust India. He is also the chairman of Haridasa Academy Karnataka. He was the honorary member of Karnataka Sahithya Academy, Government of Karnataka.

A street in Girinagar, Bangalore has been named after him.

Lecture tours
Dr. Parthasarathy has extensively toured in India and abroad, delivering lectures on Dasa Sahitya, Ramayana, Bhagavath Geetha, Vishnusahasranama, Bhakthi Bhagavatha, Sundarakanda, Shiva Panchakshari Mantra, Rudram and Chamakam, Personality Development, Values, and Meditation, and similar topics. His has delivered lectures across the United States of America and visited Europe, Australia, New Zealand, Singapore, Hong Kong and Gulf countries.

Books
Vishnu sahasra Nama (English)
Vishnu sahasra Nama (Kannada)
Haridasara 10000 Haadugalu (2000 pages Megabook)
Jagannatha Dasa Samputa
Purandara dasara Saaviraaru Hadugalu
Purandara dasara Janapriya Keerthanaigalu
Kanakadasara Janapriya Keerthanegalu
Haridasara 101 Apporva Suladigalu
Haridasa Ugabhoga Samputa
Manava Janma doddadu (500 pages felicitation volume)
Eesa beku iddu Jaisabeku (400 pages felicitation volume)
Vija dasa Namana
Haridasaru kanda Sri Krishna
Aralumallige Amrutha Nudigalu
Haridasara 4500 Haadugalu
Vadiraja Samputa
Sripadaraja Samputa
Vyasaraaja Samputa
Haridasa Jhenkara Tarangin
Purandara Samputa-I
Purandara Samputa-II
DasaSahitya Vaibahva
Janapriya Bhajana Samputa
Ranga Vittala
Dasa Sahitya Vahini
Siri Krishna
Vaikuntha Varnane
Madhwacharyaru
Samskruti Purusharu
Kalaa Tapaswi
Prachalita
Prakatita
Vinyaasa
Kriti Vimarshe
Sarvamoola
Principles of Management
Principles of Marketing
Hoovu Haavu Theertha
Yathikula Chakravarthy Vignana Nidhi Theertharu
Dasa Sahithya Sahara (1000 pages felicitation volume)
Mahatthagi Chinthisu - bruhatthagi saadhisu  - biography
Simple secrets of Super success

Audio CDs and Cassettes
Bhagavad geetha
Bhagavatha
Raamayana
Bhagavad geetha
Guru Raghavendra Namana
Vadiraja Namana
KanakaDasa Namana
VijayaDasa Namana
UgaBhogagalu
Thulasi Mahatme
Gayathri Mahatme
Purandara Namana
Powerful Personality Development
Values and Meditation: Secrets of Super Success
Vishnusahasranama (English)
Vishnusahasranama (Kannada)

Awards and honours
He has been awarded the Karnataka government Rajyothsava Award in the year 1999.

Titles conferred
Karnataka Rajyothsava Prashasthi 	- Karnataka Government, November 1999
Vidya Vaachaspathi            		- Sripdaraja Mutt
Daasasahithya Pradyumna    		- New York Kannada Koota
Sahithya Samshodhana Vachaspathi  	- Sri Vyasaraj Mutt
Daasa Sahithya Dhureena      		- Sri Uttaradi Mutt Swamiji
Daasa Sahithya Rathnakara 		- Vishwa Madhwa Sangha, USA
Haridaasa Sahitya Chaktravarthy        - VMS Washington DC
Daasa Sahithya Prachara Praveena  	- Kannada Institute of America - Michigan, USA
Daasa Sahithya Choodamani 		- Thekkatte Naagaveniyamma Trust
Haridasa Sahithya Bhaskara  		- Akhila Karnataka Dasasahithya Academy
Sri Krishnanuugraha Prashati           - Paryaya Sri Sode Mutt Swameeji
State Award 				- Karnataka State Social Welfare and Cultural Society, 1992
Haridasa Sahithya Bhushana  		- Udupi Pejawar Swameeji
Haridasa Sahithya Nalina Chandrika  	- All India Dwaitha Philosophy Conference
Karnataka Bhakthi Samrat               - Cauveri Kannada Koota, Washington DC
Haridaasa Kulabhooshana                - Mantralaya Sri Raghavendira Swamy Mutt
Karnataka Vidyanidhi                   - Qutar Kannada Sangha

See also
Dvaita
Ashta Mathas of Udupi
Bannanje Govindacharya
Vyasanakere Prabhanjanacharya
SriVadirajaNamana
SriVijayadasaNamana
Ugabhogagalu
KanakaDasa Namana

References

Aralumallige_Parthasarathy
1948 births
Living people
Dvaitin philosophers
Kannada-language writers
Scientists from Bangalore
Translators of the Bhagavad Gita